Saigo Dam is a dam in Miyazaki Prefecture, Japan, completed in 1983. It dams the Mimi River.

References

Dams in Miyazaki Prefecture
Dams completed in 1983
1983 establishments in Japan